Joseph McCabe published A Biographical Dictionary of Modern Rationalists in 1920 (London: Watts & Co.). Most (though not all) of those listed were also included in A Biographical Dictionary of Ancient, Medieval and Modern Freethinkers (1945)

A
Firmin Abauzit
Ernst Abbe
Francis Ellingwood Abbot
George Frederick Abbott
Leonard Dalton Abbott
Edmond About
Thomas Achelis or Thomas Ludwig Bernhard Achelis ( mentioned in :de:Thomas Otto Achelis, his son)
ACKERMANN, Louise V.
ACOLLAS, Professor E.
ACOSTA, Uriel
ADAM, Professor Charles, D. es L.
ADAMS, Charles Francis
ADAMS, Francis W. L.
ADAMS, John, President of the United States
ADAMS, Robert
ADAMSON, Professor Robert, Ph.D.
ADCOCK, A. St. John
ADICKES, Professor E., Ph.D.
ADLER, Professor Felix, Ph.D.
AHRENS, Professor Heinrich, Ph.D.
AIKENHEAD, Thomas
AIRY, Sir George B., K.C.B., D.C.L., LL.D., F.R.S.
AITZEMA, Lieuwe van
ALBEE, John
ALCOTT, Amos Bronson
ALEMBERT, Jean le Rond d'
ALFIERI, Count V.
ALGAROTTI, Count F.
Thomas Clifford Allbutt
ALLEN, Grant, B.A.
ALLEN, Colonel Ethan
ALLEN, John. M.D.
ALLINGHAM, William
ALLMAN, Professor G. J., LL.D., D.Sc., F.R.S.
ALLSOP, Thomas
ALTMEYER, Professor J. J., Ph.D., D.C.L.
ALVIELLA, Count Goblet d'
AMARI, Professor M.
AMICIS, Edmondo de
AMIEL, Henri F.
ANDERSON, George

B

Ba 

 François-Noël Babeuf
 Guido Baccelli
 Robert Bage
 Walter Bagehot
 Jens Immanuel Baggesen
 Julius Bahnsen
 Karl Friedrich Bahrdt
 Samuel Bailey
 George Baillie
 Alexander Bain
 Mikhail Bakunin
 James Mark Baldwin

 William Platt Ball
 John Ballance
 José Manuel Balmaceda
 Eduard Baltzer
 Honoré de Balzac
 François-Désiré Bancel ( see :fr:François-Désiré Bancel)
 Hubert Howe Bancroft
 Giuseppe Baretti
 George Barlow
 Jane Barlow

 Joel Barlow
 Antoine Barnave
 J. Edmestone Barnes
 Jules Barni ( see :fr:Jules Barni and :hu:Jules Barni)
 François Odysse Barot
 Thomas Squire Barrett
 Jules Barthélemy-Saint-Hilaire
 Paul Joseph Barthez
 Hector Alexandre Bartoli ( see :fr:Hector Alexandre Bartoli)
 Theodor Bartošek ( see :cs:Theodor Bartošek)
 Giacomo Barzelotti
 Johann Bernhard Basedow
 Marie Bashkirtseff
 John Baskerville
 Adolf Bastian
 Henry Charlton Bastian
 Frédéric Bastiat
 Henry Walter Bates
 Angelo Battelli
 Cesare Battisti
 Charles Pierre Baudelaire
 Wolf Wilhelm Friedrich von Baudissin
 Henri Baudrillart
 Bruno Bauer
 Edgar Bauer
 Ernest Belfort Bax
 Pierre Bayle

Be 

 Charles Marsh Beadnell
 Louis de Beausobre
 August Bebel
 Cesare Beccaria
 Erich Becher ( see :de:Erich Becher and :sv:Erich Becher)
 Walter Frederick Becker
 Hubert Beckers
 William Thomas Beckford
 Thomas Beddoes
 Thomas Lovell Beddoes
 Edward Spencer Beesly
 Ludwig van Beethoven
 Elphinstone Waters Begbie
 Balthasar Bekker
 Thomas Evans Bell
 Gustave Belot
 Hedwig Bender ( see :de:Hedwig Bender)
 Friedrich Eduard Beneke
 Alfred William Benn
 De Robigne Mortimer Bennett
 Arnold Bennett
 Jeremy Bentham
 Pierre-Jean de Béranger
 Henri Louis Bergson
 John Berkenhout
 Hector Berlioz
 Claude Bernard
 Henry Meyners Bernard
 Aaron Bernstein
 Eduard Bernstein
 Paul Bert
 Agostino Bertani
 Marcellin Berthelot
 Claude Louis Berthollet
 Domenico Berti ( see :it:Domenico Berti and :sv:Domenico Berti)
 Alphonse Bertillon
 Louis Bertillon
 George Berwick
 Walter Besant
 Matilda Betham-Edwards
 Richard Bethell
 Saverio Bettinelli
 Marie-Henri Beyle

Bi 

 Aurelio Bianchi-Giovini ( see :it:Aurelio Bianchi-Giovini)
 Marie François Xavier Bichat
 Ambrose Bierce
 Alfred Binet
 Jean-Baptiste Biot
 William John Birch
 George Birkbeck
 Richard Bithell
 Georges Bizet
 Edwin August Björkmann
 Bjornstjerne Bjornson
 Grigorevich Blagosvetlov
 William Blake
 Louis Blanc
 Louis Auguste Blanqui
 Robert Blatchford
 Linley Blathwayt
 Karl Bleibtreu
 Ange François Blein ( see :fr:Ange François Blein)
 Karl Blind
 Mathilde Blind
 Ivan Bloch
 Charles Blount (deist)
 Henry BLount
 Thomas Pope Blount
 Robert Blum

Bo 

 Manuel Maria Barbosa du Bocage
 Barbara Leigh Smith Bodichon
 Jean Bodin
 Wilhelm Boerner

 Nicolas Boileau-Despréaux
 Nicolas Boindin ( see :fr:Nicolas Boindin)
 Marie-Louis-Antoine-Gaston Boissier
 Arrigo Boito
 Johan Bojer
 Wilhelm Bolin ( see :fi:Wilhelm Bolin and :sv:Wilhelm Bolin)
 Henry St John, 1st Viscount Bolingbroke
 Simón Bolívar
 Wilhelm Bolsche
 Bernard Bolzano
 Jérôme Bonaparte

 Napoléon Joseph Charles Paul Bonaparte
 Ruggero Bonghi
 Rosa Bonheur
 Filippo de Boni ( see :it:Filippo De Boni)
 Charles Bonnet
 John Bonnycastle
 Charles Victor de Bonstetten
 James Bonwick
 James Booth (lawyer)
 Ignaz von Born
 Ludwig Börne
 George Borrow
 Bernard Bosanquet
 Louis Augustin Guillaume Bosc
 Christopher Jacob Boström
 Jacques Boucher de Crèvecœur de Perthes
 Louis Antoine de Bougainville
 Célestin Charles Alfred Bouglé
 Francisque Bouillier
 Henri de Boulainvilliers
 Nicolas Antoine Boulanger
 Léon Bourgeois
 Désiré-Magloire Bourneville
 Émile Boutmy
 Émile Boutroux
 Giovanni Bovio
 Charles Bowen, Baron Bowen
 Charles Bowman (secularist)
 Hjalmar Hjorth Boyesen

Br 

 Edward William Brabrook
 Charles Bradlaugh
 Hypatia Bradlaugh Bonner
 Francis Herbert Bradley
 Hans Lien Brækstad ( see book translated? by him)
 Teófilo Braga
 Johannes Brahms

 George Bramwell
 Edvard Brandes
 Georg Brandes
 Louis Brandin
 Hjalmar Branting
 Lily Braun
 Wilhelm von Braun ( see :sv:Wilhelm von Braun)
 Charles Bray
 Wilhelm Breitenbach
 Franz Brentano
 E. Cobham Brewer
 Henry Brewster (writer)
 Aristide Briand

 Horace J. Bridges
 John Henry Bridges
 Eugene Brieux
 Daniel Garrison Brinton
 Adolphe Brisson ( see :fr:Adolphe Brisson)
 Eugène Henri Brisson
 Jacques Pierre Brissot
 Augusta Cooper Bristol
 Paul Broca
 Benjamin Collins Brodie
 Rupert Brooke
 Stopford Augustus Brooke
 William Brooksbank (writer)
 Charles de Brosses
 François-Joseph-Victor Broussais
 Arthur Brown (jurist)
 Ford Madox Brown
 George William Brown (reformer)
 John Armour Brown
 Titus L. Brown
 Walston Hill Brown
 William Montgomery Brown
 Charles-Édouard Brown-Séquard
 Thomas Browne
 William George Browne
 Robert Browning
 Giordano Bruno

Bu 

 Walter James Buchanan
 Robert Buchanan (Owenite)
 Robert Williams Buchanan
 Alexander Büchner
 Friedrich Büchner
 Henry Thomas Buckle
 Odón de Buen y del Cos
 Georges-Louis Leclerc, Comte de Buffon
 Ferdinand Buisson
 Charles Buller
 Luther Burbank
 Jakob Burckhardt
 Karl Friedrich Burdach
 Francis Burdett
 William Burdon
 Thomas François Burgers
 Jean Lévesque de Burigny
 Thomas Burnet
 James Burnett, Lord Monboddo
 John Burnett
 Émile-Louis Burnouf
 Eugène Burnouf
 John Burns
 Robert Burns
 John Burroughs
 Thomas Burt
 John Hill Burton
 Richard Francis Burton
 J. B. Bury
 Samuel Butler, author of Hudibras
 Samuel Butler, novelist
 Vissarion Belinsky
 Lord Byron

C

Ca 

 George-Paul-Sylvester Cabanis
 Pierre Jean Georges Cabanis
 William Ralph Hall Caine
 Wathen Mark Wilks Call
 Laureano Calderón y Arana ( see :es:Laureano Calderón Arana)
 Salvador Calderón y Arana ( see :es:Salvador Calderón y Arana)
 Charles Callaway
 Charles Stuart Calverley

 Jean Jacques Régis de Cambacérès
 Thomas Campbell (poet)
 Giovanni Canestrini
 Stanislao Cannizzaro
 Tommaso Cannizzaro ( see :it:Tommaso Cannizzaro)
 Carlo Cantoni ( see :it:Carlo Cantoni)
 Emily Palmer Cape
 Giosuè Carducci
 Richard Carlile
 Henry Carlton (jurist)
 John Aitken Carlyle
 Thomas Carlyle
 Andrew Carnegie
 Bartolomäus von Carneri
 Lazare Hippolyte Carnot

 Lazare Nicolas Marguerite Carnot
 Marie François Sadi Carnot
 Nicolas Léonard Sadi Carnot
 Elme Marie Caro
 Queen Caroline
 Edward Carpenter
 William Benjamin Carpenter
 Herbert Wildon Carr

 Jean-Louis Carra ( see :fr:Jean-Louis Carra)
 Jean Baptiste Nicholas Armand Carrel
 Moritz Carrière
 Julius Victor Carus
 Karl Gustav Carus
 Paul Carus
 Giovanni Jacques de Seingalt Casanova
 Jean Paul Pierre Casimir-Perier
 Otto Caspari ( see :de:Otto Caspari)
 Walter Richard Cassels
 David Castelli

 Jean-Louis Castilhon
 Catherine the Great
 Carlo Cattaneo
 Giacomo Cattaneo
 Charles Cattell
 Éléonore-Louis Godefroi Cavaignac
 Felice Carlo Emmanuele Cavallotti
 Henry Cavendish
 Jean-Mamert Cayla see :fr:Jean-Mamert Cayla)
 Émile-Honoré Cazelles ( see :s:fr:Auteur:Émile Cazelles)

Ce 

 Joseph Antoine Joachim Cerutti
 Giovanni Alfredo Cesareo ( see :it:Giovanni Alfredo Cesareo)
 Paul-Armand Challemel-Lacour
 Thomas Chaloner (regicide)
 Basil Hall Chamberlain
 Daniel Henry Chamberlain
 Houston Stewart Chamberlain
 Ephraim Chambers
 Robert Chambers (publisher, born 1802)
 Sebastien-Roch Nicolas Chamfort
 Adelbert von Chamisso
 Jean-François Champollion
 Francis Leggatt Chantrey
 John Chapman (publisher)
 Jean Antoine Claude Chaptal
 Victor Charbonnel ( but :fr:Victor Charbonnel has incoming links)
 Antoine Charma ( see :fr:Antoine Charma)
 Pierre Charron
 François-Jean de Chastellux
 Gabrielle Émilie du Châtelet
 Thomas Chatterton
 Pierre Gaspard Chaumette
 Pierre-Jean-Baptiste Chaussard
 Anton Pavlovich Chekhov
 André Marie Chénier
 Marie-Joseph Chénier
 Alice Chenoweth
 Charles Victor Cherbuliez
 Maria Luigi Carlo Zenobio Salvatore Cherubini
 Ramón Chíes y Gómez de Riofranco
 Lydia Maria Francis Child
 William Chilton (printer)
 Percival Chubb
 Thomas Chubb
 Jules Arsène Arnaud Claretie
 Marcus Andrew Hislop Clarke
 Georges Eugène Benjamin Clemenceau
 Samuel Langhorne Clemens
 Martin Clifford
 William Kingdon Clifford
 Mrs. W. K. Clifford
 Henry Cline
 Edward Clodd
 Jean-Baptiste du Val-de-Grâce, baron de Cloots
 Arthur Hugh Clough
 Thomas Clouston

Co 

 Chapman Cohen
 Hermann Cohen
 Stanton Coit
 Henry John Coke
 John Duke Coleridge
 Jean Guillaume César Alexandre Hippolyte, baron de Colins ( see :fr:Jean Hippolyte Colins de Ham)
 John Collier (painter)
 Christen Christian Dreyer Collin
 Anthony Collins
 John Churton Collins
 Lucy N. Colman
 Giovanni Battista Comazzi ( but we have lots of fleurons from his book. Cf. Henry Coventry (deist))
 Andrew Combe
 George Combe
 Émile Justin Louis Combes
 Thomas Common
 Domenico Comparetti
 Jules Gabriel Compayré
 François-Charles-Louis Comte
 Isidore Marie Auguste François Xavier Comte
 Étienne Bonnot de Mably de Condillac
 Marie Jean Antoine Nicolas de Caritat, Marquis of Condorcet
 Marie Louise Sophie Grouchy, Marquise of Condorcet
 Richard Congreve
 Joseph Conrad
 Henri-Benjamin Constant de Rebecque
 Vasile Conta (Basil Conta)
 Hugh Conway
 Moncure Daniel Conway
 William Martin Conway
 Frederick Cornwallis Conybeare
 Keningale Robert Cook ( now only remembered as the husband of Mabel Collins)
 Anthony Ashley Cooper, 1st Earl of Shaftesbury
 Anthony Ashley-Cooper, 3rd Earl of Shaftesbury
 John Gilbert Cooper
 Robert Cooper (Owenite)
 Thomas Cooper
 Edward Drinker Cope
 Henri Arthur Marie Cornette
 Otto Julius Bernhard von Corvin-Wiersbitzki
 Henry John Stedman Cotton
 Paul Louis Courier de Méré
 Leonard Henry Courtney
 William Leonard Courtney
 Victor Cousin
 Henry Coventry (deist) ( but we have lots of fleurons from his book. Cf. Giovanni Battista Comazzi )
 William Coward
 Joseph Cowen

 Johan Nikolai Cramer
 Christopher Pearse Cranch
 Walter Crane
 William Randal Cremer
 Vincenzo Crescini ( see :it:Vincenzo Crescini)
 Benedetto Croce
 David Goodman Croly
 Henry Crompton
 Mary Ann Cross (George Eliot)
 John Beattie Crozier
 Franz-Valéry-Marie Cumont
 Heinrich Czolbe

D

Da 

 Étienne Noël Damilaville
 Jean Philibert Damiron
 Vincenzo Dandolo
 Agnes Mary Frances Darmesteter
 James Darmesteter
 Frances Darusmont
 Charles Darwin
 Erasmus Darwin
 Francis Darwin
 George Howard Darwin
 Leonard Darwin
 Alphonse Daudet
 Pierre Claude François Daunou
 Jacques-Louis David
 Caroline Augusta Rhys Davids
 Thomas William Rhys Davids
 John Davidson (poet)
 Thomas Davidson (philosopher)
 Charles Maurice Davies
 Helen Hamilton Gardner Day

De 

 Élie Louis Marie Marc Antoine Debidour ( see :fr:Antonin Debidour)
 Lauro Adolfo De Bosis
 Claude Achille Debussy
 Charles-Theodore-Henri De Coster
 Saverio Fausto De Dominicis ( see :it:Saverio Fausto De Dominicis)
 Marie Anne de Vichy-Chamrond, marquise du Deffand
 Angelo de Gubernatis
 Edward Dowes Dekker (Multatuli)
 Ferdinand Victor Eugène Delacroix
 Marie Yves Delage
 Jean Baptiste Joseph Delambre
 Jean-François Casimir Delavigne
 Joseph Rémi Léopold Delbœuf
 Étienne Marie Justin Victor Delbos
 Léon Delbos
 Théophile Delcassé
 Jean-Baptiste-Claude Delisle de Sales

 Alexandre Deleyre
 Augustus De Morgan
 Ève Demaillot 
 James Steuart Denham
 Joseph Deniker
 Hector Denis ( see :fr:Hector Denis)
 William F. Denton
 César De Paepe
 Agathon Louis de Potter
 Louis Joseph Antoine de Potter
 Maria Deraismes
 Pasquale d'Ercole
 Francesco de Sanctis
 Léger Marie Deschamps
 Émile Auguste Étienne Martin Deschanel
 Paul Eugène Louis Deschanel
 Marius Deshumbert
 André-François Boureau-Deslandes
 Pierre Desmaizeaux
 Lucie Simplice Camille Benoît Desmoulins
 Gustave Le Brisoys Desnoiresterres ( see :fr:Gustave Desnoiresterres
 Joseph Marie Dessaix

 Pierre-Joseph Destriveaux
 Antoine Louis Claude Destutt de Tracy
 Rowland Detrosier
 Konrad Deubler ( see :de:Konrad Deubler)
 Willem Deurhoff
 Immanuel Oscar Menahem Deutsch
 John Dewey
 Henry de Worms

Di 

 Porfirio Díaz
 Goldsworthy Lowes Dickinson
 Auguste Dide ( see :fr:Auguste Dide)
 Denis Diderot
 Gustav Diercks
 Joseph Dietzgen
 Ashton Wentworth Dilke
 Charles Wentworth Dilke
 Gustav Friedrich Dinter
 Johann Konrad Dippel
 Florence Caroline Dixie
 Bertram Dobell
 Johann Wolfgang Döbereiner
 Nikolay Alexandrovich Dobrolyubov
 Arnold Dodel-Port
 Henry Dodwell (deist) ( see s:Dodwell, Henry (d.1784) (DNB00))
 Horatio Bryan Donkin
 John Sholto Douglas
 Stephen Arnold Douglas
 Edward Dowden

Dr 

 Jacques Philippe Raymond Draparnaud
 John William Draper
 Edmond Dresden
 Arthur Drews
 Hans Adolf Eduard Driesch
 William James Charles Maria Drummond of Logiealmond
 Helene von Druskowitz
 Charles Robert Drysdale
 John Dryden (merchant)

Du 

 Julius Duboc
 Paul-François Dubois ( see :fr:Paul-François Dubois)
 Emil du Bois-Reymond
 Pierre-Ulric Dubuisson
 Agnes Mary Frances Duclaux
 Charles Pinot Duclos

 Jean-François Ducos
 William Dudgeon (philosopher)
 Eugen Karl Dühring
 Édouard Dujardin
 Jacques-Antoine Dulaure ( see :fr:Jacques-Antoine Dulaure)
 Henri Joseph Du Laurens
 Albert Friedrich Benno Dulk
 Alexandre Dumas, fils
 George Louis Palmella Busson du Maurier
 Léon Dumont
 Pierre Étienne Louis Dumont
 David Duncan (educationist) ( see his most well known work)
 Maximilian Wolfgang Duncker
 Jacob Louis Dupont ( see :fr:Jacques Louis Dupont)
 Pierre Samuel du Pont de Nemours
 Charles-François Dupuis
 Émile Durkheim
 Jean Victor Duruy
 Théophile-Imarigeon Duvernet

E 

 Daniel Isaac Eaton

 Johann Augustus Eberhard
 Ernst Theodor Echtermeyer
 Johann Peter Eckermann
 Johann Christian Edelmann ( see :de:Johann Christian Edelmann)
 Thomas Alva Edison
 Chilperic Edwards
 John Passmore Edwards
 Justus van Effen
 Johann Gottfried Eichhorn
 Rudolf Eisler
 Charles William Eliot
 George Eliot
 Pietro Ellero ( see :it:Pietro Ellero)
 Hugh Samuel Roger Elliot
 John Elliotson
 Alfred Burdon Ellis
 Henry Havelock Ellis
 William Ellis
 Mountstuart Elphinstone
 Ralph Waldo Emerson
 William Emerson
 Robert Emmet
 Friedrich Engels
 George Bethune English
 George Ensor
 Johann Eduard Erdmann
 John Ericsson
 François-Louis d'Escherny ( see :fr:François d'Escherny)
 Alfred Victor Espinas
 José de Espronceda
 Henri-François-Alphonse Esquiros
 George Henry Evans
 Mary Ann Evans (George Eliot)
 Antoine-François Ève 
 Moses Jacob Ezekiel

F 

 Ferdinand Fabre
 Jean-Henri Fabre

 Philippe François Nazaire Fabre d'Églantine
 Bruto Fabricatore ( see :it:Bruto Fabricatore)
 Adolfo Faggi
 Auguste Émile Faguet
 Clement Armand Fallières
 Frederick John Fargus
 John Farquhar
 Hippolyte Fauche ( see :fr:Hippolyte Fauche)
 Félix François Faure
 Sébastien Faure
 Edgar Fawcett
 Henry Fawcett
 Everard Fawkener
 Gustav Theodor Fechner
 Robert Fellowes
 Joseph Fels
 Giuseppe Ferrari
 Francisco Ferrer y Guardia
 Guglielmo Ferrero
 Enrico Ferri
 Luigi Ferri
 Jules François Camille Ferry
 Friedrich Heinrich Feuerbach
 Ludwig Feuerbach
 Johann Gottlieb Fichte
 Harold Patrick Fielding-Hall
 Estanislao Figueras y de Moragas
 Gaetano Filangieri
 Heinrich Finke ( see :de:Heinrich Finke)
 Francesco Fiorentino
 Johann Georg Fischer
 Ernst Kuno Berthold Fischer
 John Fiske
 Edward FitzGerald
 Nicolas Camille Flammarion
 "Flanor" (Carel Vosmaer)
 Gustave Flaubert
 Charles Thomas Floquet
 Gustave Flourens
 Marie Jean Pierre Flourens
 Benjamin Orange Flower
 Eliza Flower

Fo 

 Wilhelm Julius Foerster
 Albany Fonblanque
 Theodor Fontane
 Bernard Le Bovier de Fontenelle
 George William Foote
 Friedrich Karl Forberg
 Auguste Forel
 James George Roche Forlong
 Karl Fortlage
 Niccolò Ugo Foscolo
 Alfred Jules Émile Fouillée
 Jean-Baptiste Joseph Fourier
 François Marie Charles Fourier
 Charles James Fox
 Elizabeth Vassall Fox
 Henry Fox, 1st Baron Holland

 Henry Richard Vassall-Fox
 William Johnson Fox
 Anatole France
 Adolphe Franck ( see :fr:Adolphe Franck)
 Nicolas-Louis François de Neufchâteau
 Edward Frankland
 Benjamin Franklin
 John Fransham
 Christian Martin Julius Frauenstädt
 James George Frazer
 Frederick II of Prussia
 William Freke
 Ferdinand Freiligrath
 William Frend (reformer)
 Hubert Joseph Walthère Frère-Orban
 Nicolas Fréret
 Charles Louis de Saulces de Freycinet
 Gustav Freytag
 Jakob Friedrich Fries
 Friedrich Fröbel
 Octavius Brooks Frothingham
 James Anthony Froude
 John Fry (regicide)
 Sarah Margaret Fuller Ossoli
 Max Fürbringer
 Frederick James Furnivall

G

Ga 

 Hans Friedrich Gadow
 Matilda Joslyn Gage
 Henri Gaidoz
 Benito Pérez Galdós
 Ferdinando Galiani
 Franz Joseph Gall

 Abraham Alfonse Albert Gallatin

 Walter Matthew Gallichan
 John Galsworthy
 Francis Galton
 Léon Michel Gambetta
 Charles Ferdinand Gambon ( see :fr:Charles Ferdinand Gambon)
 Antonio Rodríguez García-Vao ( see :es:Antonio Rodríguez García-Vao)
 Helen Hamilton Gardener
 Giuseppe Garibaldi
 Edward William Garnett
 Lucy Mary Jane Garnett
 Richard Garnett (writer)
 William Lloyd Garrison
 Samuel Garth
 Pierre Jules Théophile Gautier
 Joseph Louis Gay-Lussac
 Erik Gustaf Geijer
 Barbe Gendre
 Petrus Augustus de Génestet
 François Génin
 Antonio Genovesi
 Marie Thérèse Rodet Geoffrin
 Étienne Geoffroy Saint-Hilaire
 Isidore Geoffroy Saint-Hilaire
 Friedrich Wilhelm Ghillany
 Arcangelo Ghisleri
 Pietro Giannone
 Edward Gibbon
 Franklin Henry Giddings
 Adam Gifford
 Charlotte Perkins Gilman
 Ernest William Gimson
 Josiah Gimson
 Sydney Ansell Gimson
 Pierre-Louis Ginguené
 Melchiorre Gioia
 Stephen Girard
 Maria Gisborne
 George Robert Gissing
 Georg von Gizycki ( see :de:Georg von Gizycki)
 John Stuart Stuart-Glennie
 Francis Glisson
 Joseph Arthur de Gobineau
 René Goblet
 Eugène Goblet d'Alviella
 W. S. Godfrey
 Edwin Lawrence Godkin
 Mary Wollstonecraft
 William Godwin
 Johann Wolfgang von Goethe
 John Goldie (philosopher)
 Theodor Goldstücker
 Ignác Goldziher
 George Laurence Gomme

 Heinrich Gomperz
 Theodor Gomperz
 Edmond Louis Antoine Huot de Goncourt
 Jules Alfred Huot de Goncourt
 Giuseppe Gorani ( see :it:Giuseppe Gorani)
 Adam Lindsay Gordon
 Thomas Gordon (writer)
 Charles Turner Gorham
 Alexei Maximovitch Peshkov Gorky
 Frederick James Gould
 Remy de Gourmont

Gr 

 William Graham (economist)
 Kerr Grant
 Ulysses Simpson Grant
 Mountstuart Elphinstone Grant Duff
 Benjamin Kirkman Gray
 Octave Vallery Clément Gréard
 John Richard Green
 Joseph Frederick Green

 Kate Greenaway
 Edward Greenly
 Granville George Greenwood
 William Rathbone Greg
 Ferdinand Gregorovius
 William Henry Gregory
 Charles Cavendish Fulke Greville
 François Paul Jules Grévy
 Albert Henry George Grey
 Lepel Henry Griffin
 Dod Grile
 Franz Grillparzer
 Friedrich Melchior von Grimm
 Eduard Grisebach ( see :de:Eduard Grisebach)
 Francis Hindes Groome
 Karl Groos
 Alessandro Groppali
 Elici Gropuel (appears in A Biographical Dictionary of Ancient, Medieval and Modern Freethinkers)
 Nikolai Yakolevich Grot ( see :ru:Грот, Николай Яковлевич)
 George Grote
 Harriet Grote
 Karl Theodor Ferdinand Grün
 Louis Auguste Jean François Philippe Gruyer ( see :fr:Louis Gruyer)
 Ange Guépin ( see :fr:Ange Guépin)
 Adolphe Georges Guéroult ( see :fr:Adolphe Georges Guéroult)
 Abílio Manuel Guerra Junqueiro
 Olindo Guerrini

 Jules Basile Guesde
 Nicolas Gueudeville ( see :fr:Nicolas Gueudeville)
 Louisa Sarah Bevington Guggenberger
 Émile Étienne Guimet
 William Withey Gull
 Ludwig Gumplowicz
 Nicolaus Hieronymus Gundling
 Frans Christiaan Günst
 Edmund Gurney
 Jean-Marie Guyau
 Yves Guyot
 Gustaf Fredrik Gyllenborg

J
John Jacob
Jens Peter Jacobsen
Louis Jacolliot
Henry James
William James
Leander Starr Jameson
Joseph Jastrow
Morris Jastrow, Jr.
Louis de Jaucourt
Jean Leon Jaurès
Richard Jefferies

Thomas Jefferson
Francis Jeffrey, Lord Jeffrey
Peter Christian Albrecht Jensen ( see :de:Peter Jensen (Altorientalist))
Charles Jervas
Friedrich Jodl ( see :de:Friedrich Jodl)
Richard Mentor Johnson
Samuel Johnson
Harry Hamilton Johnston
Ernest Jones
David Starr Jordan
Théodore Simon Jouffroy
Benjamin Jowett
Benito Pablo Juárez
Mark Hayler Judge
Franz Wilhelm Junghuhn

K
Alexander Kadison
Marcus Kalisch
Albert Kalthoff
Henry Home, Lord Kames
Immanuel Kant
Otto Karmin
Karl Johann Kautsky
Augustus Henry Keane
Charles Francis Keary ( several refs to him mainly in refs)
John Keats
Charles Samuel Keene
George Keith, 10th Earl Marischal
James Francis Edward Keith
Johan Henric Kellgren
William Kenrick
Ellen Key
Cassius Jackson Keyser
Alexander Lange Kielland
Søren Aaby Kierkegaard
Peter King, 1776–1833
Alexander William Kinglake
George Henry Kingsley ( brother of Charles Kingsley)
Mary Henrietta Kingsley
Hermann Klaatsch
Heinrich von Kleist
Abner Kneeland
Otto Knopf ( see the eponymous Knopfia asteroid)
Robert Knox
James Knowles
Matthias Knutzen
Hermann Kolbe
Selig Korn ( see this)
Ernst Ludwig Krause
Karl Christian Friedrich Krause
Franz Krejei
Arnold Krekel
Pyotr Kropotkin

M

Ma 

 James Macartney (anatomist)
 Joseph McCabe
 William Maccall
 Mauro Macchi ( see :it:Mauro Macchi)
 Eugene Montague Macdonald
 George Everett Macdonald
 Ernst Waldfried Josef Wenzel Mach
 Bernardino Machado
 Charles Mackay (author)
 Robert William Mackay ( see :s:Mackay, Robert William (DNB00))
 John Stuart Mackenzie
 Sampson Arnold Mackey
 James Mackintosh
 John M'Taggart Ellis M'Taggart
 Imre Madách
 James Madison
 Johann Heinrich von Mädler
 Maurice Polydore Marie Bernard Maeterlinck
 Jean Hyacinthe de Magellan
 Frederic William Maitland
 Arthur François Ève Maillot
 François de Malherbe
 David Mallet (writer)
 Benoît Malon
 Hector Henri Malot
 Conrad Malte-Brun
 Terenzio Mamiani della Royere
 Bernard Mandeville
 Willem Christiaan van Manen
 Mangasar Mugurditch Mangasarian
 Paolo Mantegazza
 Jean-Paul Marat
 José Marchena Ruiz de Cueto
 Giovanni Marchesini ( but :it:Giovanni Marchesini is a different professor at the University of Padua!)

 Pierre Sylvain Maréchal
 Robert Ranulph Marett
 Victor Margueritte
 François Auguste Ferdinand Mariette
 Léon Marillier ( see :fr:Léon Marillier)
 Alberto Mario ( see :it:Alberto Mario)
 Jessie White Mario
 Edward Laurens Mark
 Erich Marcks (
 Murray Marks (
 Christopher Marlowe
 Jean-François Marmontel
 Thomas Marryat
 Henry Rutgers Marshall
 Philip Bourke Marston

 François-Marie de Marsy ( :fr:François-Marie de Marsy)
 Henry Marten (regicide)
 Alfred Wilhelm Martin
 Bon Louis Henri Martin

 Emma Martin (socialist)
 Harriet Martineau
 Charles Frédéric Martins  see :fr:Charles Frédéric Martins)
 Francis Sidney Marvin
 Karl Marx
 Tomáš Garrigue Masaryk
 Pietro Antonio Stefano Mascagni

 Filippo Masci ( see :it:Filippo Masci)
 Josiah Mason
 Jules Émile Frédéric Massenet
 Gerald Massey
 Marie-Alexandre Massol ( see s:fr:La Sculpture dans les cimetières de Paris/Père-Lachaise/75)
 Jean-Henri Maubert de Gouvest ( see :fr:Jean-Henri Maubert de Gouvest)
 Aylmer Maude
 Henry Maudsley
 Henri René Albert Guy de Maupassant
 Pierre Louis Moreau de Maupertuis
 Jakob Mauvillon
 Hiram Stevens Maxim
 Friedrich Max Müller
 Frederick Augustus Maxse
 Walther Victor May
 Giuseppe Mazzini

Me 

 Thomas Medwin
 Alfred Meissner
 Jean Henri Meister
 William Lamb, 2nd Viscount Melbourne
 Félix Jules Méline
 Herman Melville
 Louis-Nicolas Ménard
 Moses Mendelssohn
 Catulle Mendès
 Juan Álvarez Mendizábal
 Ernest Mendum
 Josiah P. Mendum
 Edme Mentelle
 Charles Arthur Mercier
 Evan Powell Meredith
 George Meredith
 Prosper Mérimée
 Henry Merritt (artist)
 Jean Meslier
 Ilya Ilyich Mechnikov
 Hans Meyer (geologist)
 Louis Compton Miall
 Jules Michelet
 Karl Ludwig Michelet
 Conyers Middleton
 Domenico Milelli ( see :it:Domenico Milelli)
 James Mill
 John Stuart Mill

 John Millar (philosopher)
 Constantin Mille
 Florence Fenwick Miller
 Alexandre Millerand
 Jean-Baptiste Millière ( see :fr:Jean-Baptiste Millière)
 Richard Monckton Milnes
 Pavel Nikolayevich Milyukov
 Jean-Baptiste de Mirabaud
 Honoré Gabriel Riqueti, comte de Mirabeau
 Francisco de Miranda
 Octave Mirbeau
 Peter Chalmers Mitchell
 Carl Joseph Anton Mittermaier

Mo 

 Jakob Moleschott
 Robert Molesworth
 William Molesworth
 Jean Baptiste Poquelin Molière

 John Charles Molteno
 Alfred Williams Momerie ( see s:Momerie, Alfred Williams (DNB01))
 Theodor Mommsen
 Lord Monboddo
 Gaspard Monge
 Antoine Mongez ( see :fr:Antoine Mongez)
 J. R. Monroe

 Messenger Monsey
 Basil Montagu
 Edward Montagu
 Mary Wortley Montagu
 Michel Eyquem de Montaigne
 Charles François Louis Edgar Monteil ( see :fr:Edgar Monteil)
 Charles-Louis de Secondat, Baron de La Brède et de Montesquieu
 Anne-Pierre, marquis de Montesquiou-Fézensac
 Edmund Duncan Montgomery
 Joseph-Michel Montgolfier
 Friedrich Mook ( see :de:Friedrich Mook)
 Benjamin Moore (biochemist)
 George Augustus Moore
 George Edward Moore
 John Howard Moore
 Miguel Moraita
 Hégésippe Moreau
 Jacques-Joseph Moreau
 André Morellet
 Giovanni Morelli
 N. Morelly
 William Richard Morfill
 Conwy Lloyd Morgan
 Thomas Morgan (deist)
 Thomas Charles Morgan
 Robert Burnett David Morier
 André Saturnin Morin
 James Augustus Cotter Morison
 John Morley

 Gouverneur Morris
 William Morris
 George Ernest Morrison
 Edward Sylvester Morse
 Enrico "Henry" Agostino Morselli
 Adrien de Mortillet ( see :fr:Adrien de Mortillet)
 Louis Laurent Gabriel de Mortillet
 Felix Stone Moscheles
 Arthur B. Moss
 Angelo Mosso
 John Lothrop Motley
 Wolfgang Amadeus Mozart
 John Henry Muirhead
 Friedrich Max Müller
 Hugo Münsterberg
 Roderick Impey Murchison
 Henri Murger
 Gilbert Murray
 Alfred Louis Charles de Musset-Pathay

N 
 Constance Caroline Woodhill Naden
 Jacques-André Naigeon
 Fridtjof Nansen
 Charles James Napier
 Alfred Joseph Naquet
 Francisco Manoel de Nascimento
 Gaetano Negri
 Ada Negri-Garlanda
 Gustav Nelson
 Carl Wilhelm Neumann
 Henry Woodd Nevinson
 Simon Newcomb
 H. Osman Newland
 Ernest Newman
 Francis William Newman
 George Newnes
 John Nichol (biographer)
 John Pringle Nichol
 William Nicholson (chemist)
 Christoph Friedrich Nicolai
 Barthold Georg Niebuhr
 Andrzej Niemojewski
 Friedrich Wilhelm Nietzsche
 Ferdinand Jacobus Domela Nieuwenhuis

 Florence Nightingale
 Ludwig Noiré
 Theodor Nöldeke
 Max Simon Nordau
 "F. Nork" ( see this)
 "Christopher North"
 Charles Eliot Norton
 Yakov Novikov
 Rufus King Noyes
 Christen Anton Nyström ( see :sv:Anton Nyström)

O 
 James Bronterre O'Brien
 Arthur Condorcet-O'Connor
 George Odger

 Hans Christian Ørsted
 Bernardo O'Higgins
 Lorenz Oken
 Josiah Oldfield
 Giacomo Omboni
 Julius (Jules) Oppert
 Alfred Richard Orage
 Johann Caspar von Orelli
 José María Orense Milá de Aragón Herrero
 Arnold Edward Ortmann
 William Osler
 Sarah Margaret Fuller Ossoli
 Wilhelm Ostwald
 Eugen Oswald
 Felix Leopold Oswald ( see s:Felix Leopold Oswald)
 John Oswald (activist)
 "Ouida" (Marie Louise de la Ramée)
 Harry Allen Overstreet
 Richard Overton (Leveller)
 Robert Owen
 Robert Dale Owen

P 
 Jean Paul (Johann Paul Friedrich Richter)
 Edward John Pilcher

R

Ra 

 Carl Rabl
 Alfred Nicolas Rambaud
 Marie Louise de la Ramée "Ouida"
 Santiago Ramón y Cajal
 William Ramsay
 William James Ramsey
 Arthur Ranc
 Mario Rapisardi
 François-Vincent Raspail
 Samuel Kerkham Ratcliffe
 Albrecht Rau
 Henry Creswicke Rawlinson
 Guillaume Thomas François Raynal
 Carveth Read

 William Winwood Reade
 Élie Reclus
 Jean Jacques Élisée Reclus
 Paul Reclus
 Mario Reghillini
 Albert-Adrien Regnard ( see :fr:Albert Regnard)
 Michel-Louis-Étienne Regnaud de Saint-Jean d'Angély
 George Archdall O'Brien Reid
 Johann Christian Reil
 Hermann Samuel Reimarus
 Joseph Reinach
 Salomon Reinach
 Théodore Reinach
 Ernst Christian Gottlieb Reinhold
 Karl Leonhard Reinhold
 John Eleazer Remsburg
 Charles François Marie, Comte de Rémusat
 Jean-Pierre Abel-Rémusat
 Paul Louis Étienne Remusat
 Henriette Renan
 Joseph Ernest Renan
 Georges François Renard
 Charles Bernard Renouvier
 Karl Gustav Reuschle ( see :de:Karl Gustav Reuschle)
 Marie Roch Louis Reybaud

 Jean Ernest Reynaud
 Charles B. Reynolds
 Cecil John Rhodes
 John Rhys
 Charles Ribeyrolles ( see :fr:Charles Ribeyrolles)
 Alexandre-Félix-Joseph Ribot
 Théodule-Armand Ribot
 David Ricardo
 Giuseppe Napoleone Ricciardi ( see :it:Giuseppe Ricciardi (1808))
 Benjamin Ward Richardson
 Jean Richepin
 Charles Richet

 Johann Paul Friedrich Richter
 Thomas 'Clio' Rickman
 Aloys Adolf Riehl
 Eugenio Rignano
 David George Ritchie
 Gustave Rivet ( see :fr:Gustave Rivet)
 José Rizal

Ro 

 Matilda Roalfe
 Isaac Roberts
 Morley Roberts

 R. Roberts
 George Croom Robertson
 John Mackinnon Robertson
 Eugène de Robert y de la Cerda
 Maximilien François Marie Isidore de Robespierre
 Charles-Philippe Robin
 Édouard Charles Albert Robin
 Jean-Baptiste-René Robinet

 Jean-François Eugène Robinet
 Henry Crabb Robinson
 Louis Édouard Rod
 François Auguste René Rodin
 Louis-Augustin Rogeard ( see :fr:Louis-Augustin Rogeard)
 James Edwin Thorold Rogers
 Karl von Rokitansky
 Jean Marie Roland de la Platière
 Marie-Jeanne Roland de la Platière
 Romain Rolland
 Thomas William Hazen Rolleston

 Gian Domenico Romagnosi
 Samuel Romilly
 Gilbert Romme
 Sicco Ernst Willem Roorda van Eysinga ( see :fy:Sicco Roorda van Eysinga and :nl:Sicco Roorda van Eysinga)
 Ernestine Louise Lasmond Potovsky Rose
 Johann Karl Friedrich Rosenkranz
 Georg Gustav Roskoff
 Joseph Henri Rosny
 Louis Léon Lucien Prunol de Rosny ( see :fr:Léon de Rosny)
 Edward Alsworth Ross
 Ronald Ross
 William Stewart Ross
 Dante Gabriel Rossetti
 William Michael Rossetti
 Emil Adolf Rossmässler
 Edmond Eugène Alexis Rostand
 Karl Wenzeslaus Rodecker von Rotteck
 Jean-Jacques Rousseau
 Pierre Maurice Rouvier
 Josiah Royce
 Clémence Royer
 Arnold Ruge
 Cosimo Ruggieri ( see :it:Cosimo Ruggieri and other wikis)
 John Ruskin
 Bertrand Arthur William Russell
 John Russell, Viscount Amberley
 John Russell (educationist)
 John Francis Stanley Russell
 "Mark Rutherford" (William Hale White)
 Abraham Viktor Rydberg

W
Samuel Waddington
Richard Wagner

Charles Burlingame Waite
Theodor Waitz
Edward Wakefield
Edward Gibbon Wakefield
Gilbert Wakefield
Thaddeus B. Wakeman
Charles Athanase Walckenaer
François Walferdin (see :fr:François Walferdin)
Ernest Walker
John Walker ( adopted Quaker dress but not accepted into membership)
Alfred Russel Wallace
William Wallace
Horace Walpole
Robert Walpole
Walter Walsh
Johannes Walther
William Walwyn
Lester Frank Ward
Josiah Warren
Daisy Greville, Countess of Warwick
L. K. Washburn
George Washington
James Watson
William Watson
James Watt
Charles Watts
Charles Albert Watts
George Frederic Watts
John Watts (writer)
John Watts (reformer)
Theodore Watts-Dunton
Karl Julius Weber
August Weismann
Wilhelm Weitling
Julius Wellhausen
H. G. Wells
Richard Brodhead Westbrook
Baron Westbury
Edvard Westermarck
John Westlake
Samuel Burns Weston
Otto Wettstein
George Whale (writer)
Joseph Mazzini Wheeler
James McNeill Whistler
Andrew Dickson White
William Hale White
Walt Whitman
Thomas Whittaker
Adam Gowans Whyte

Wi
Knut Wicksell
Christoph Martin Wieland
Otto Wigand ( see :de:Otto Wigand and :hu:Otto Wigand)
Adolf Wilbrandt
Ella Wheeler Wilcox
John Wilkes
Bruno Wille
Charles Hanbury Williams
David Williams
Roger Williams
William Mattieu Williams
Robert Willis
Andrew Wilson
David Alec Wilson
 John Wilson (Scottish writer) (no article in the dictionary but cross referenced from "Christopher North" )
Roland Knyvet Wilson
Wyndham Wilton
Hugo Winckler
John Richard de Capel Wise ( and ebooks)
Gustav Adolf Wislicenus
Susan H. Wixon
William Wollaston
Mary Wollstonecraft
Henry Wood
Thomas Jonathan Wooler

Thomas Woolner
Thomas Woolston
Chauncey Wright
Elizur Wright
Michael Wright (Owenite)
Clement Writer
Wilhelm Max Wundt
Christian Ernst Wünsch (see :pl:Christian Ernst Wünsch)
Charles-Adolphe Wurtz
Grigorio Nicolaievich Wyrouboff

X
Augustin Louis de Ximénès

Y
 Percival Macleod Yearsley ( see this at UCL)
 Edward L. Youmans
 William Jay Youmans
 Francis Younghusband

Z
 Giuseppe Zanardelli
 Israel Zangwill
 Francisco Zarco ( see :es:Francisco Zarco)
 Eduard Zeller
 Gustav Zerffi
 Heinrich Ernst Ziegler ( see :de:Heinrich Ernst Ziegler)
 Theobald Ziegler
 Georg Theodor Ziehen
 Helen Zimmern
 Émile Zola
 Manuel Ruiz Zorrilla
 Charles Zueblin
 Luigi Zuppetta ( see :it:Luigi Zuppetta)

References 

Names in A Biographical Dictionary of Modern Rationalists
Names in A Biographical Dictionary of Modern Rationalists
Rationalists